Memorial Stadium is a stadium in Bloomington, Indiana. It is primarily used for football, and has been the home of Indiana Hoosiers football since its opening in 1960. It is the tenth largest stadium in the Big Ten Conference, with a capacity of 52,626.

History 
The stadium officially opened in 1960 as part of a new athletics area at the university and replaced the original Memorial Stadium built in 1925 (a 20,000-seat stadium located on 10th Street in Indiana University's Arboretum). The current Memorial Stadium has been renovated or updated multiple times since the original construction. Improvements include the replacement of the original wooden seats with aluminum bleachers, installation of sound and lighting systems, and major structural overhauls.

On June 1, 2003, a $3.5 million renovation of the Memorial Stadium press box was completed, which also added 300 indoor club seats and 9 suites. In the summer of 2003, the Hoosier locker room in Memorial Stadium underwent a $250,000 renovation. The facelift to the original 1986 facility included renovating and modernizing the existing space with new carpeting, lighting, and a new bulkhead ceiling along with the installation of custom-built oak wood lockers for 105 football players. The renovation was funded in large part by former Hoosier quarterback Trent Green his wife Julie and philanthropist Ted Derheimer.  In 2019, the $8.5 million Terry Tallen Indiana Football Complex opened, after J.C. Ripberger Construction Corp was able to finish the project in only 6 months, including an expanded and renovated locker room area, training room and sports lounge, to allow players to get acquainted with video games on 98" televisions.

A 36 x  HD scoreboard from Daktronics was added to the South End Zone for the 2010 season (which is the 29th largest collegiate scoreboard in the country), along with a state-of-the-art sound system.

Features

Playing surface 
The field at the stadium was originally natural grass, but this was replaced in 1970 with artificial turf, which was updated to AstroTurf in 1986. The AstroTurf was replaced with grass in 1998, but the field soon reverted to an artificial surface (AstroPlay) in 2003. Heavy rains in June 2008 severely damaged the field, washing away the gravel substrate, and creating a large sinkhole in the south end zone, which led to the installation of a FieldTurf surface.  A new FieldTurf Revolution 360 playing surface was installed prior to the 2016 season.

"Hep's Rock" 

In 2005, head football coach Terry Hoeppner had a southern Indiana limestone boulder, nicknamed "The Rock", installed in the north end zone as a new campus tradition. This limestone boulder was found prior to Hoeppner's first season at IU in the practice field. It was removed, put on a granite slab and moved to the stadium. The Hoosiers and coach Hoeppner walked out and touched the Rock before running onto the field at every home game during Hoeppner's time as head coach (a tradition that continues today). Terry Hoeppner died of brain cancer on June 19, 2007, and The Rock (renamed "Hep's Rock" during a ceremony with the Hoeppner family on November 6, 2010) now serves as motivation for the team as well as a tribute to Hoeppner's influence on the football program.

USS Indiana Prow, mast and guns 
The battleship saw extensive service in the Pacific Theater during World War II, taking part in the invasion of the Gilbert Islands, Marshall Islands, Marianas campaign, and the Battle of Iwo Jima and earning nine battle stars.

North End Zone Student-Athlete Development Center 
In September 2006, Indiana University announced plans to expand Memorial Stadium and enclose the north end zone. Demolition of the North End Zone bleachers took place in January 2007.  This left capacity for the 2007 and 2008 seasons at 49,225.

The expansion provides additional space for classrooms, a  weight/training room, a Hall of Fame, and expanded seating for football, raising the stadium's seating capacity to 52,692. The expansion is part of an overall $55 million expansion of several Indiana University athletic facilities.  The project was completed as scheduled in August 2009, and was ready for the Hoosiers when they opened against Eastern Kentucky on September 3, 2009.

Indiana Athletic Director Fred Glass announced in July 2009 $3 million of additional renovations to the stadium for the 2009 season, including a new "retro" North End Zone scoreboard, a "Knothole Park" kids area in the south end zone, upgrades to the press box, repainting walkways, renovated concession stands, additional ticket booths, and new fencing around the stadium.

South End Zone Student-Athlete Excellence Center 
Indiana University Athletic Director Fred Glass said on October 9, 2014 that a project to enclose the south end of Memorial Stadium is being planned at an estimated cost of $10 million. The project will include: a new rehabilitation and treatment facility for athletes, additional academic and life skills support facilities, a "multi-use" outdoor terrace on the roof of the structure, an entry plaza and green space at the south end of the stadium. The project was confirmed in March 2016, and is expected to be completed for the 2018 season. The total cost is $53 million.  A new  video board was installed in the North End Zone for the 2017 season, with a  video board installed prior to the 2018 season, in the completed south end zone.

Gallery

Attendance

See also 

 List of NCAA Division I FBS football stadiums

References

External links 

 
 World Stadiums.com - photos - Memorial Stadium

College football venues
Indiana Hoosiers football
American football venues in Indiana
1960 establishments in Indiana